Anisoplia agricola is a species of shining leaf chafers in the family Scarabaeidae.

Description
Coloration of the elytrae is quite variable, ranging from greenish black to yellow or reddish with cross-shaped black marks.

Biology
These beetles mainly feed on wild grasses, but can damages crops. They live in steppe and forest-steppe areas.

Distribution
This species is present in most of Europe, in Asia Minor in the Caucasus and in Central Asia from Western Siberia and Kazakhstan up to Mongolia.

References 

Scarabaeidae
Beetles described in 1761
Taxa named by Nikolaus Poda von Neuhaus